The 1949 Titleholders Championship was contested from March 17–20 at Augusta Country Club. It was the 10th edition of the Titleholders Championship.

This event was won by Peggy Kirk.

Final leaderboard

External links
St. Petersburg Times source

Titleholders Championship
Golf in Georgia (U.S. state)
Women's sports in Georgia (U.S. state)
Titleholders Championship
Titleholders Championship
Titleholders
Titleholders Championship